Tag, TAG, or tagging may refer to:

Identification and tracking

 Tagging (graffiti), a form of graffiti signature
 Dog tag (military), an ID tag worn by military personnel
 Ear tag, an ID tag worn by farm animals
 Electronic tagging, a form of surveillance using a device attached to a person or vehicle
 Kimball tag, predecessor to the barcode, used to identify products to a stock control system
 Pet tag, an ID tag worn by pets
 QR code or mobile tag, a type of matrix barcode 
 RFID tag, passive electronic inventory stock control technology
 Toe tag, an ID tag worn by dead bodies in the morgue
 Triage tag, a tool used to classify victims of mass casualty incidents
 Tagging (stamp)

Arts, entertainment, and media

Fictional characters
 Tag (comics), a Marvel character
 Tag, the main character of the game ModNation Racers
 Tag, the main character of the TV series Rimba Racer

Films
 Tag (2015 film), a 2015 Japanese film
 Tag (2018 film), a 2018 American comedy film

Music
 Tag (barbershop music), a dramatic variation in the last section of a song
 TAG Recordings, a record label
 Producer tag, a brief sound clip as the signature of the producer of the music track

Television
 Tag (TV channel), a defunct Philippine TV channel 
 T@gged, a 2016–2018 American web series
 "Tagged" (The Penguins of Madagascar episode)

Theatre
 TAG Theatre Company, a touring theatre company in Scotland
 The Theatre Arts Guild or TAG, a community theatre in Halifax Nova Scotia

Other arts, entertainment, and media
 Tag (advertisement), a sportswear commercial
 Tag: The Power of Paint, a computer game
 Tag Entertainment, a film production company
 Tagged (website), a social networking site
 Tagging (graffiti), a form/style of graffiti signature
 Post-credits scene, a clip appearing at the end of some media

Brands and enterprises
 TAG Body Spray
 Tag Games, developer in Scotland 
 TAG Group, Luxembourg
 TAG Heuer, watchmaker 
 TAG Oil, New Zealand
 Tennessee, Alabama and Georgia Railway, reporting mark
 Transportes Aéreos Guatemaltecos, a Guatemalan airline

Computing
 TAG (BBS), bulletin board software
 Tag (Facebook), a link in Facebook
 Tag (metadata)
 Tag (programming), for passing parameters
 Tags (Unicode block), with formatting tag characters
 Tag, an element in several markup languages
 HTML tag
 Revision tag, for a specific revision
 Audio tag, see 
 Tag files, an index of source code identifiers
 Tag system, a deterministic computational model
 Tag URI, a unique identifier protocol
 Technical Architecture Group, a W3C group

Government and political organizations
 State adjutant general, US
 Tactical Assault Group, Australia
 Tamils Against Genocide
 Treatment Action Group, an HIV/AIDS activist organization
 -Tag, a German word for "Diet" or "Assembly" (see: Bundestag)

Language and education
 Tag (Hebrew writing), a decoration
 Tag (LeapFrog), an interactive reading device
 Hashtag
 Part-of-speech tagging
 Tag question, a statement converted to a question
 Talented and Gifted program, in education
 School for the Talented and Gifted, Dallas, Texas, US
 Tree-adjoining grammar

Natural science
 3-methyladenine DNA glycosylase I, called TAG in E. coli
 Protein tag, a biochemistry method
 Skin tag, a small benign tumour
 Theoretical and Applied Genetics, a scientific journal
 Timneh African grey, a parrot
 Triglyceride or Triacylglycerol, often shortened to TAG
 Tumor-associated glycoprotein, a type of protein
 TAG, a stop codon

People with surname Tag 
 Katrin Lea Tag (born 1972), German scenic designer and costume designer
 Kezban Tağ (born 1993), Turkish footballer

Sport
 Tag (game), a playground game
 Tag (horse), an 18th-century thoroughbred racehorse
 Tag out, a play in baseball
 Tag team, a type of wrestling
 Alex Tagliani, Canadian racecar driver, nicknamed "Tag"

Other uses
 Bohol–Panglao International Airport, Philippines; opened in 2018
 Tagbilaran Airport, Bohol, Philippines; closed in 2018
 Topological abelian group, in mathematics
 Trans Austria Gas Pipeline
 Transcendental argument for the existence of God

See also
 T&G (disambiguation) (T and G)
 Tagged (disambiguation)
 Tagger (disambiguation)
 Tagline, a form of advertising slogan